Boundary Creek Times is a newspaper published weekly in Greenwood in the Kootenay Boundary region of southern British Columbia published by Black Press. The newspaper was published between September 1896 and March 1911. The Boundary Creek Times was published by the Times Publishing Company (1896–99), and later by Boundary Creek Printing and Publishing Company (1901–1911), Duncan Ross (1897–1907) was the paper's longest-serving editor. The Boundary Creek Times was taken over by The Ledge, another Greenwood-based paper, in April 1911. In 1983 the Boundary Creek Times was revived and continues to be published to present.

See also
List of newspapers in Canada

References

Publications established in 1896
1896 establishments in British Columbia
Weekly newspapers published in British Columbia